The 1991 German Open was a men's tennis tournament played on outdoor clay courts. It was the 85th edition of the Hamburg Masters (Hamburg Masters), and was part of the ATP Super 9 of the 1991 ATP Tour. It took place at the Rothenbaum Tennis Center in Hamburg, Germany, from 6 May until 13 May 1991. Karel Nováček, who was seeded 13th,  won the singles title.

Finals

Singles

 Karel Nováček defeated  Magnus Gustafsson, 6–3, 6–3, 5–7, 0–6, 6–1 
It was Karel Nováček's 2nd title of the year, and his 5th overall. It was his 1st Masters title of the year, and overall.

Doubles

 Sergio Casal /  Emilio Sánchez defeated  Cássio Motta /  Danie Visser, 4–6, 6–3, 6–2

References

External links
   
 ATP tournament profile
 ITF tournament edition details

 
German Open
Hamburg European Open
ATP German Open